Ukumari (Quechua for bear or spectacled bear, hispanicized spelling Ucumari) was an Inca prince and general supporting the cause of Atahualpa in the Inca Civil War. 

The name is used for a military leader in a children's historical novel by Daniel Peters.

References 

Inca Empire people
Indigenous leaders of the Americas
Indigenous military personnel of the Americas
Warriors of Central and South America
Year of birth missing

Nobility of the Americas